The Pearl Harbor Monument is a memorial commemorating Texans enrolled in the military during the attack on Pearl Harbor on December 7, 1941, installed on the Texas State Capitol grounds in Austin, Texas, United States. The Texas Sunset Red Granite and marble monument was designed by Scott Field and erected by the Pearl Harbor Survivors of Texas in 1989. It features inscriptions and the bronze seal of the Pearl Harbor Survivors Association.

See also

 1989 in art

References

1989 establishments in Texas
1989 sculptures
Attack on Pearl Harbor
Granite sculptures in Texas
Marble sculptures in Texas
Monuments and memorials in Texas
Outdoor sculptures in Austin, Texas